Dhiraina is a small town in Sirmaur district, the Himachal Pradesh state of North India.

Notable residents
 Professional wrestler, WWE World Heavyweight Champion Dalip Singh, better known as The Great Khali, was born in this village.

References 

Cities and towns in Sirmaur district